Zizou Bergs was the defending champion but lost in the second round to Kacper Żuk.

Evgenii Tiurnev won the title after defeating Żuk 6–4, 6–2 in the final.

Seeds

Draw

Finals

Top half

Bottom half

References

External links
Main draw
Qualifying draw

Saint Petersburg Challenger II - 1